Methanol toxicity (also methanol poisoning) is poisoning from methanol, characteristically via ingestion. Symptoms may include a decreased level of consciousness, poor or no coordination, vomiting, abdominal pain, and a specific smell on the breath. Decreased vision may start as early as twelve hours after exposure. Long-term outcomes may include blindness and kidney failure. Blindness may occur after drinking as little as 10 mL; death may occur after drinking quantities over 15 mL (median 100 mL, varies depending on body weight). 

Methanol poisoning most commonly occurs following the drinking of windshield washer fluid. This may be accidental or as part of an attempted suicide. Toxicity may also rarely occur through extensive skin exposure or breathing in fumes. When methanol is broken down by the body it results in formaldehyde, formic acid, and formate which cause much of the toxicity. The diagnosis may be suspected when there is acidosis or an increased osmol gap and confirmed by directly measuring blood levels. Other conditions that can produce similar symptoms include infections, exposure to other toxic alcohols, serotonin syndrome, and diabetic ketoacidosis.

Early treatment increases the chance of a good outcome. Treatment consists of stabilizing the person, followed by the use of an antidote. The preferred antidote is fomepizole, with ethanol used if this is not available. Hemodialysis may also be used in those where there is organ damage or a high degree of acidosis. Other treatments may include sodium bicarbonate, folate, and thiamine.

Outbreaks of methanol ingestion have occurred due to contamination of drinking alcohol. This is more common in the developing world. In 2013 more than 1700 cases occurred in the United States. Those affected are usually adult and male. Toxicity to methanol has been described as early as 1856.

Signs and symptoms
The initial symptoms of methanol intoxication include central nervous system depression, headache, dizziness, nausea, lack of coordination, and confusion. Sufficiently large doses cause unconsciousness and death. The initial symptoms of methanol exposure are usually less severe than the symptoms from the ingestion of a similar quantity of ethanol. Once the initial symptoms have passed, a second set of symptoms arises, from 10 to as many as 30 hours after the initial exposure, that may include blurring or complete loss of vision, acidosis, and putaminal hemorrhages, an uncommon but serious complication. These symptoms result from the accumulation of toxic levels of formate in the blood, and may progress to death by respiratory failure. Physical examination may show tachypnea, and eye examination may show dilated pupils with hyperemia of the optic disc and retinal edema.

Cause
Methanol has a moderate to high toxicity in humans. As little as 10 mL of pure methanol when drunk is metabolized into formic acid, which can cause permanent blindness by destruction of the optic nerve. 15 mL is potentially fatal, although the median lethal dose is typically 100 mL (3.4 fl oz) (i.e. 1–2 mL/kg body weight of pure methanol). Reference dose for methanol is 0.5 mg/kg/day.

Ethanol is sometimes denatured (adulterated), and made poisonous, by the addition of methanol. The result is known as methylated spirit, "meths" (British use) or "metho" (Australian slang). This is not to be confused with "meth", a common abbreviation for methamphetamine and for methadone in Britain and the United States.

Mechanism
Methanol is toxic by two mechanisms. First, methanol (whether it enters the body by ingestion, inhalation, or absorption through the skin) can be fatal due to its CNS depressant properties in the same manner as ethanol poisoning. Second, in a process of toxication, it is metabolized to formic acid (which is present as the formate ion) via formaldehyde in a process initiated by the enzyme alcohol dehydrogenase in the liver. Methanol is converted to formaldehyde via alcohol dehydrogenase and formaldehyde is converted to formic acid (formate) via aldehyde dehydrogenase.  The conversion to formate via ALDH proceeds completely, with no detectable formaldehyde remaining. Formate is toxic because it inhibits mitochondrial cytochrome c oxidase, causing hypoxia at the cellular level, and metabolic acidosis, among a variety of other metabolic disturbances.

Treatment
Methanol poisoning can be treated with fomepizole, or if unavailable, ethanol may be used. Both drugs act to reduce the action of alcohol dehydrogenase on methanol by means of competitive inhibition.  Ethanol, the active ingredient in alcoholic beverages, acts as a competitive inhibitor by more effectively binding and saturating the alcohol dehydrogenase enzyme in the liver, thus blocking the binding of methanol.  Methanol is excreted by the kidneys without being converted into the very toxic metabolites formaldehyde and formic acid.  Alcohol dehydrogenase instead enzymatically converts ethanol to acetaldehyde, a much less toxic organic molecule. Additional treatment may include sodium bicarbonate for metabolic acidosis, and hemodialysis or hemodiafiltration to remove methanol and formate from the blood. Folinic acid or folic acid is also administered to enhance the metabolism of formate.

History

There are cases of methanol resistance, such as that of Mike Malloy, whom someone tried and failed to poison by methanol in the early 1930s.

In December 2016, 78 people died in Irkutsk, Russia from methanol poisoning after ingesting a counterfeit body lotion that was primarily methanol rather than ethanol as labeled. The body lotion, prior to the event, had been used as a cheap substitute for vodka by the impoverished people in the region despite warnings on the lotion's bottles that it was not safe for drinking and long-standing problems with alcohol poisoning across the country.

During the COVID-19 pandemic, Iranian media reported that nearly 300 people had died and over a thousand became ill due to methanol poisoning in the belief that drinking the alcohol could help with the disease. In the United States, the Food and Drug Administration discovered that a number of brands of hand sanitizer manufactured in Mexico during the pandemic contained methanol, and urged the public to avoid using the affected products.

See also
Ethylene glycol poisoning

References

External links 

Toxicology
Toxic
Wikipedia medicine articles ready to translate
Wikipedia emergency medicine articles ready to translate